The 2022 Pacific FC season is the fourth season in the history of Pacific FC. In addition to the Canadian Premier League, the club competed in the Canadian Championship and the CONCACAF League.

Pacific FC are the defending CPL champions, having defeated Forge FC in the 2021 Canadian Premier League Final. This is the club's first season led by James Merriman, who was announced as the club's new head coach on January 21, 2022.

Overview 
As the defending champions, Pacific FC came into the 2022 Canadian Premier League season with high expectations. However, there was significant turnover from the 2021 season. Championship-winning head coach Pa-Modou Kah departed to lead North Texas SC, leaving assistant coach James Merriman in charge. As a result of their impressive performances in the previous season, both Kadin Chung and Lukas MacNaughton signed deals with MLS club Toronto FC; both are tough losses for Pacific's backline. Additionally, forward Terran Campbell and midfielder Alessandro Hojabrpour, who scored the winning goal in the 2021 championship final, both signed with 2021 runners-up Forge FC, to the dismay of Pacific. These changes raised questions about Pacific's capability at repeating last season's success. However, the club retained several of its most important performers, including 2021 MVP Marco Bustos, starting goalkeeper Callum Irving, and prolific striker Alejandro Diaz. The Tridents also signed some new talent, most notably Canadian international defender Amer Đidić from FC Edmonton.

Current squad

Transfers

In

Loans in

Draft picks 
Pacific FC made the following selections in the 2022 CPL–U Sports Draft. Draft picks are not automatically signed to the team roster. Only those who are signed to a contract will be listed as transfers in.

Out

Loans out

Pre-season and friendlies

Competitions
Matches are listed in Langford local time: Pacific Daylight Time (UTC−7) until November 5, and Pacific Standard Time (UTC−8) otherwise.

Overview

Canadian Premier League

Table

Results by match

Matches

Playoffs

Semifinals

Canadian Championship

CONCACAF League

Preliminary round

Round of 16

Statistics

Squad and statistics 

|-

|-
|}

Top scorers

Disciplinary record

References

External links 
Official Site

2022
2022 Canadian Premier League
Canadian soccer clubs 2022 season